Glyphipterix nicaeella is a moth of the  family Glyphipterigidae. It is found in France and Switzerland.

The wingspan is about 11 mm.

References

Moths described in 1866
Glyphipterigidae
Moths of Europe